The Jidir Plain or Jydyr Plain ( (Jidir Duzi)) is a plain in the southern part of Shusha, Azerbaijan. The name literally translates as horse racing field from Azerbaijani referring to the tradition of holding horse racing games in the times of the Karabakh Khanate.

Location 
The western part of Shusha rises 1,800 meters and the eastern part 1,400 meters above sea level. The Jidir Plain is located in the southern relatively flat yet higher part of Shusha. This meadow overlooks the valley and the Dashalty gorge through which the Dashalty river flows 200 meters below. A trail on the edge of the Jidir Plain leads to Girkh Pillakan (40 steps), a forty step path which in turn leads down to the Dashalty gorge and Khazina Galasy ("Treasure Castle") cave by the river.

Significance 
The Jidir Plain has always been the main location for festivities and sporting events in Shusha. From the time of Shusha's establishment, wrestling matches were part of periodic competitions held by the Karabakh Khans. Both horse racing and camel racing matches were held here. Chovgan (Azerbaijani variation of polo) was also played here. Participants of the games also excelled in jigitovka, a type of horse riding stunt games. Ibrahim Khalil Khan who was fond of Karabakh horses, held official semi-annual horse racing games in the khanate while the regular races took place on a weekly basis. Youth received awards for exceptional horse riding stunts. One of the variations of the Jidir Plain jigitovka was baharbandi where the participants had to throw off their papakh, rifle, dagger, shashka at assigned spots at full speed and then collect them on their way back with the same speed.
The Jidir Plain was also a place for Novruz celebrations as well as official welcoming ceremonies for international guests. The festivities included tightrope walking, stilts and jester performances accompanied by music. The field was often compared to a hippodrome.

Notes 

Geography of Shusha
Tourist attractions in Shusha
Culture in Shusha
Horse racing